State comptroller can refer to:

National comptrollers
State Comptroller of Israel

U.S. states
Connecticut State Comptroller
Florida Comptroller
State Comptroller of Illinois
State Comptroller of Maryland
State Comptroller of New Jersey
State Comptroller of New York
Texas Comptroller of Public Accounts